Steep Theatre Company is a not-for-profit theatre company located in the Edgewater neighborhood of Chicago, Illinois. Founded in 2000 by Peter Moore, Alex Gillmor, and Alex Gualino, Steep has become known as one of Chicago's iconic ensemble-based storefront theatres. Chicago is known for its brand of bold, collaborative, actor-driven theatre in intimate venues scattered throughout the city's many neighborhoods, and Steep is an embodiment of this theatrical movement. The ensemble has produced over 60 plays and cultivated a growing community of artists and audience members.  In 2019, through a gift from the Bayless Family Foundation, Steep announced it would become an Equity theater.

Current Season

2018–2019 
Zürich by Amelia Roper

Red Rex by Ike Holter

First Love is the Revolution by Rita Kalnejais

Pomona by Alistair McDowall

History 
After two years of producing plays as an itinerant company, Steep opened its first storefront theatre in the Wrigleyville neighborhood of Chicago. Over the years, Steep has grown from an original founding of three actors into an ensemble of 41 artists driven by a shared commitment to their mission: "To bring out the everyday truths in the stories we tell through ensemble work and to reach out to non-traditional theater goers by seeking out stories and creating experiences relevant to them."

In October 2008, Steep moved to a new storefront – a newly renovated theatre in Chicago's Edgewater neighborhood. This flexible black box theatre seats approximately 55 people. Steep continues to flourish in its new home, where an impressive string of hits has cemented its reputation as one of the most compelling ensembles in the city. Steep's growing artistic ensemble, engaged board of directors, and current leadership team, founder and Artistic Director Peter Moore and Executive Director Kate Piatt-Eckert, are poised to continue Steep on its trajectory of growth and artistic accomplishment.

In 2015, Steep Theatre produced the National Premiere of "Martyr" by Marius Von Mayenburg. In 2016, The Student based much of its imagery off of Steep Theatre's production including the use of Chalk art in its poster 

In addition to the mainstage theater, Steep operates a bar and small cabaret-style performance space in the adjoining storefront.  This space, The Boxcar, opened to the public in August 2018. It features free programmed performances Sunday and Monday evenings. Steep Ensemble Member Thomas Dixon serves as The Boxcar's Artistic Curator.

Ensemble Members and Artistic Associates

Ensemble 
Steep Theatre Company members include actors, directors, artists, writers, and other theatre artists.

Artistic Associates

Productions 
† indicates World Premiere production

‡ indicates U.S. Premiere production

Season 1 (2001–02)
 Life During Wartime by Keith Reddin
 Search and Destroy by Howard Korder
 Pvt. Wars by James McLure
 †These Flowers are for My Mother by Michael McGuire
 Geography of a Horse Dreamer by Sam Shepard
Season 2 (2002–03)
 ‡The Aspidistra Code by Mark O’Rowe
 The Job by Shem Bitterman
 My Donkey Lady by John Wilson
 Below the Belt by Richard Dresser
 The Hot House by Harold Pinter
Season 3 (2004)
 The Time Trial by Jack Gilhooley
 Dealer’s Choice by Patrick Marber
Season 4 (2004–05)
 Howie the Rookie by Mark O’Rowe
 Incident at Vichy by Arthur Miller
 Book of Days by Lanford Wilson
 †Pleasanton by John Wilson
Season 5 (2005–06)
 Catch-22 by Joseph Heller
 The Night Heron by Jez Butterworth
 Of Mice and Men by John Steinbeck
 Bang the Drum Slowly by Mark Harris, adapted by Eric Simonson
Season 6 (2006–07)
 The Last Days of Judas Iscariot by Stephen Adly Guirgis
 Otherwise Engaged by Simon Gray
 The Resistible Rise of Arturo Ui by Bertolt Brecht
 Insignificance by Terry Johnson
Season 7 (2007–08)
 Coronado by Dennis Lehane
 Breathing Corpses by Laura Wade
 Greensboro: A Requiem by Emily Mann
Season 8 (2008 – 09)
 †Seven Days by Egan Reich
 In Arabia We’d All Be Kings by Stephen Adly Gurgis
 Parlour Song by Jez Butterworth
 The Hollow Lands by Howard Korder
Season 9 (2009–10)
 Kill the Old Torture Their Young by David Harrower
 ‡Harper Regan by Simon Stephens
 ‡2,000 Feet Away by Anthony Weigh
Season 10 (2010–11)
 A Brief History of Helen of Troy by Mark Shultz
 Lakeboat by David Mamet
 Festen by David Elridge, Thomas Vinterberg, Morgan Rukov, Bo Hr. Hansen
 Pornography by Simon Stephens
Season 11 (2011–12)
 Under the Blue Sky by David Eldridge 
 Love and Money by Dennis Kelly
 The Receptionist by Adam Bock
 ‡Moment by Dierdre Kinahan
Season 12 (2012–13)
 Making Noise Quietly by Robert Holman
 Luther by Ethan Lipton
 ‡The Knowledge by John Donnelly
 Fallow by Kenneth Lin
Season 13 (2013–14)
 ‡Motortown by Simon Stephens
 strangers, babies by Linda McLean
 If There Is I Haven’t Found It Yet by Nick Payne
 A Small Fire by Adam Bock
Season 14 (2014–15)

 The Vandal by Hamish Linklater
 The Life and Sort of Death of Eric Argyle by Ross Dungan
 ‡Martyr by Marius von Mayenburg
 ‡Brilliant Adventures by Alistair McDowall
Season 15 (2015–16)

 †The Cheats by Hamish Linklater
 Posh by Laura Wade
 The Few by Samuel D. Hunter
 ‡Wastwater by Simon Stephens
Season 16 (2016–17)

 †Bobbie Clearly by Alex Lubischer
 Earthquakes in London by Mike Bartlett
 Hookman by Lauren Yee
 ‡Lela & Co. by Cordelia Lynn
Season 17 (2017–18)

 The Invisible Hand by Ayad Akhtar
 †Hinter by Calamity West
 ‡Birdland by Simon Stephens
 Linda by Penelope Skinner

Awards and nominations 
Steep was named 2010 Broadway in Chicago Emerging Theatre Award winner.

Jeff Awards

References

Theatre companies in Chicago
2000 establishments in Illinois